Gregorella is a genus of lichenized fungi in the family Arctomiaceae. This is a monotypic genus, containing the single species Gregorella humida.

The genus and species were circumscribed by Helge Thorsten Lumbsch in Lichenologist vol.37 on page 298 in 2005.

The genus name of Gregorella is in honour of Dieter Gregor Zimmermann (b.1942), a German musician and (amateur) Lichenologist. "The new genus is described in honour of Dieter Gregor Zimmermann (Düsseldorf) who first introduced HTL to this fascinating lichen in the field."

References

Baeomycetales
Lichen genera
Monotypic Lecanoromycetes genera
Taxa described in 2005
Taxa named by Helge Thorsten Lumbsch